Laetia micrantha is a species of plant in the Salicaceae family. It is endemic to Panama.  It is threatened by habitat loss.

References

Flora of Panama
micrantha
Vulnerable plants
Taxonomy articles created by Polbot